Henry William Hoffman (November 10, 1825 – July 28, 1895) was a U.S. Representative from Maryland.

Born in Cumberland, Maryland, Hoffman attended the public schools and Allegany County Academy.  He graduated from Jefferson College (now Washington & Jefferson College) in Pennsylvania, in 1846.  He studied law, and was admitted to the bar in 1848.

Hoffman was elected by the American Party to the Thirty-fourth Congress (March 4, 1855 – March 3, 1857).  He was an unsuccessful candidate for reelection in 1856 to the Thirty-fifth Congress and for election in 1858 to the Thirty-sixth Congress.  After his tenure in Congress, Hoffman served as treasurer of the Chesapeake & Ohio Canal Co. from 1858 to 1860.

Hoffman was elected Sergeant at Arms of the House of Representatives in the Thirty-sixth Congress and served from February 3, 1860, to July 5, 1861.
He was appointed by President Abraham Lincoln as collector of customs at Baltimore, Maryland, and served from 1861 to 1866.  He resumed the practice of law in Cumberland, Maryland.

Hoffman was elected associate judge of the sixth Maryland circuit court in 1883 and served until his death in Cumberland, Maryland, July 28, 1895.
He is interred in Rose Hill Cemetery.

References

1825 births
1895 deaths
Lawyers from Cumberland, Maryland
Know-Nothing members of the United States House of Representatives from Maryland
Maryland state court judges
Washington & Jefferson College alumni
Sergeants at Arms of the United States House of Representatives
19th-century American politicians
19th-century American judges
Politicians from Cumberland, Maryland
Burials at Rose Hill Cemetery (Cumberland, Maryland)
Members of the United States House of Representatives from Maryland